Compass FM was an Independent Local Radio station serving Grimsby, Cleethorpes and Immingham. Last owned by Bauer Radio, the station broadcast from 2001 to 2020, when it was subsumed by Greatest Hits Radio, as part of its Yorkshire region.

Licence application
Three applications were received by the Radio Authority by 5 September 2000, which also included the proposed Haven FM and Southbank FM, having been first advertised in May 2000. The licence for the station was awarded on 24 November 2000.

Format
Compass FM sat within its sister station's (Lincs FM) TSA (Total Service Area), and the station's format reflected this.

Programming
Compass FM provided 24/7 programming, some of which was automated (where the presenter's links between the records are pre-recorded).

Transmitter information

The 96.4 FM signal, now used by Greatest Hits Radio, comes from a low-powered transmitter at Bevan Flats in East Marsh in north Grimsby near the A180. This transmitter also has Bauer Humberside.

Awards
Compass FM was the NTL Commercial Radio Station of the Year in 2003 (under 300,000 TSA).

Merger with Greatest Hits Radio
On 27 May 2020, it was announced that Compass FM, among other stations acquired when Bauer purchased the Lincs FM Group, would join Bauer's Greatest Hits Radio network.

In September 2020, the station rebranded as Greatest Hits Radio and merged with several other local stations. The station's local breakfast show was replaced by a regional drivetime show. Localised news bulletins, traffic updates and advertising were retained.

References

External links
 
 Media UK
 Jingles
 Reception map
  History of local radio in Lincolnshire
 Award of Grimsby FM licence in November 2000 to Compass FM

Borough of North East Lincolnshire
Radio stations in Lincolnshire
Mass media in Grimsby
Bauer Radio
Radio stations established in 2001
Radio stations disestablished in 2020
Classic hits radio stations
Defunct radio stations in the United Kingdom